Gunman or Gunmen may refer to:

A word sometimes used to describe a criminal armed with a gun perpetrating a mass shooting 
A word used to call a gunfighter before the 20th century
Gunman (film), a 1983 Thai crime film directed by Chatrichalerm Yukol
Gunmen (1988 film), a 1988 Hong Kong action crime drama film
Gunmen (1994 film), a 1994 action-comedy film directed by Deran Sarafian
"Gunman" (187 Lockdown song), a 1997 song by speed garage duo 187 Lockdown
Gunman Chronicles, a 2000 computer game by Rewolf Software
The Gunman (2015 film), an American thriller film directed by Pierre Morel
The Gunman (1952 film), an American western film directed by Lewis D. Collins
"The Gunman", a song by Cher from It's a Man's World, 1995

See also
Gun (disambiguation)
Gunner (disambiguation)